Burford District Elementary School is a public elementary school in the community of Burford, County of Brant, Ontario, Canada in the Grand Erie District School Board.

The school was formed after Burford District High School closed following the 2001–2002 school year due to low enrolment. The building was renovated to become Burford District Elementary School for the 2002–2003 school year. The student population was drawn from three local elementary schools which were closed at the same time: Coronation, Maple Avenue, and Harley-Northfield schools.

The name Burford District Elementary School was chosen as the result of a public contest suggesting names.

References

External links
Office web site

Elementary schools in the County of Brant